Gnani Seguabdulcader Mohamed Sheni Abdul Razick, known as Ghulam Razick (10 December 1942 – 26 October 2019) was a cricketer who played for Ceylon in the 1960s.

Ghulam Razick was a hard-hitting right-handed batsman, a right-arm fast-medium bowler and an outstanding slip fieldsman. He attended Zahira College, Colombo, where he captained the cricket team in the 1963–64 season. He played successfully for Moors in senior domestic cricket in Ceylon, and was selected to play for Ceylon. He was less successful at first-class level, but he played a leading part in Ceylon's victory over the touring English team in a one-day match in 1968–69, taking three wickets and scoring the winning runs.

Razick was born in India when his father was there temporarily on business. He continued the family business of manufacturing shoes and running a garment factory. He and his wife Zeenath Munawar had one daughter and two sons.

In September 2018, he was one of 49 former Sri Lankan cricketers honoured by Sri Lanka Cricket for their services before Sri Lanka became a full member of the International Cricket Council.

References

External links

Ghulam Razick at CricketArchive

1942 births
2019 deaths
People from Ramanathapuram district
Alumni of Zahira College, Colombo
Sri Lankan cricketers
All-Ceylon cricketers
Sri Lankan people of Indian descent